Presidential elections were held in Chile on 4 September 1952. The result was a victory for Carlos Ibáñez del Campo, who ran as an independent.

Electoral system
The election was held using the absolute majority system, under which a candidate had to receive over 50% of the popular vote to be elected. If no candidate received over 50% of the vote, both houses of the National Congress would come together to vote on the two candidates who received the most votes.

Candidates

Pedro Enrique Alfonso
Alfonso was the candidate of the Radical Party, and was also supported by the social democratic parties. His government would have become the fourth consecutive Radical administration, since Pedro Aguirre Cerda was elected president.

Salvador Allende
Allende, a Senator, was the candidate of the Socialist Party, and was running for President for the first time. He had the support of the banned Communist Party. Allende would run three more times, winning in 1970.

Carlos Ibáñez del Campo
Former President Ibáñez was an independent Senator for Santiago, and was attempting to reach the presidency, once again, by popular vote. He had the support of minor parties, like the Socialist Popular Party and the Agrarian Labor Party, among others.

Arturo Matte
Matte was a Liberal Party Senator supported by the Liberal and Conservative parties. He was Finance Minister under the administration of Juan Antonio Ríos.

Results

References

Presidential elections in Chile
Chile
Presidential
Chile